El Taref is a district in El Taref Province, Algeria. It was named after its capital, El Taref, which is also the capital of the province.

Municipalities
The district is further divided into 4 municipalities:
El Taref
Aïn El Assel
Bougous
Zitouna

Districts of El Taref Province